Rolândia is a municipality in the state of Paraná in the Southern Region of Brazil. Rolândia was settled by German immigrants who named it after (and erected a statue to) the medieval hero Roland, a symbol of freedom in Germany.

See also
List of municipalities in Paraná

References